Safe is a 2012 American action thriller film written and directed by Boaz Yakin, produced by Lawrence Bender, Dana Brunetti and Joseph Zolfo and starring Jason Statham, Chris Sarandon, Robert John Burke and James Hong. Statham plays Luke Wright, an ex-cop and former cage fighter who winds up protecting a gifted child who is being chased by the Russian mafia, Chinese Triads, and corrupt New York City police.

Safe was released by Lionsgate Films on April 27, 2012. The film grossed $40.6 million worldwide against a budget of $30 million with mixed reviews from critics.

Plot
Ex-cop and cage fighter Luke Wright unintentionally wins a fixed fight, angering Emile Docheski, head of the Russian mafia. As punishment, Docheski's son Vassily and his men kill Wright's pregnant wife, then promise to kill anyone to whom he speaks regularly. Luke leaves his life behind, becoming a homeless tramp. Meanwhile, in China, Mei, a young mathematical prodigy, is kidnapped by men working for Triad boss Han Jiao. Han wishes to use Mei as a mental calculator to eliminate his criminal enterprise's traceable digital footprint. He sends her to New York City, in the care of brutal gangster Quan Chang.

One year later, Han arrives from China, asking Mei to memorize a long number. On the way to retrieve a second number, their vehicle is ambushed by the Russian mafia. Mei is taken to Emile, who demands the number, but Mei refuses. Before they can further interrogate her, they are interrupted by police, sent by the corrupt Captain Wolf, who works for Han. Mei escapes during the confusion, chased by the Russians to a nearby subway station, where Luke contemplates suicide. Recognizing Chemyakin, one of the men who killed his wife, and seeing Mei's distress, Luke boards the train and kills Chemyakin and the other Russians. Mei flees at the next stop, only to be stopped by two corrupt detectives working for Wolf. Luke arrives and incapacitates the detectives, convincing Mei of his good intentions, before he also dispatches some Russians.

Hiding in a hotel, Mei explains the number to Luke, who guesses that it is the code to a combination safe. However, Quan tracks Mei down through her cell phone and escapes with her during a diversion, as Luke fights through Quan's men. Across town, Captain Wolf meets with Mayor Danny Tremello, who has learned that Luke is involved. He cautions Wolf, explaining that Luke wasn't a regular cop, but a black ops hitman for the government loaned as a favor to Tremello by friends in the CIA shortly after 9/11, along with his former partner Alex Rosen. Luke and Alex assassinated several crime bosses as an effort to impose order, and Luke quit after exposing Wolf's detective squad as dirty cops. Luke is living a life of exile as atonement for the things he did for the government.

Using Chemyakin's phone, Luke sets up Vassily, whom he kidnaps. Emile reluctantly accepts a deal for his son's life, explaining that Mei's number unlocks a heavily guarded safe in Chinatown with $30 million, though he does not know the contents of a second safe. Needing a team to get to the safe, Luke recruits Wolf and his detectives. Together, they fight through numerous Triad gangsters to reach the safe. As Luke is about to open it, Wolf attempts to betray him, but Luke kills the remaining detectives and takes Wolf hostage. Using the money, Luke bribes Alex, now the mayor's aide and boyfriend, into rescuing Mei. Alex reveals the second safe belongs to the mayor, containing a disc with data on every crime syndicate in New York. Alex meets and kills Quan and his men as Mei watches. Elsewhere, Luke assaults the mayor and retrieves a copy of the mayor's disc.

Alex and Luke arrange a meeting, but Luke refuses to surrender the money, instead suggesting that they settle it with a fight. Before they can begin, Mei shoots Alex, wounding him, and Luke finishes him off. In the aftermath, Luke gives Wolf $50,000 and instructs him to return Vassily to his father, unharmed. He sends the remainder of the money to Han to buy Mei's freedom, threatening to ruin Han's operations should Han try to recover Mei. Han leaves New York City in disgust, as Luke hides multiple copies of the disc throughout the city. Luke and Mei make plans to leave the city and head west, possibly to Seattle. When Mei asks if they are finally safe, Luke responds that they will take it one day at a time.

Cast

Production
Safe was announced on May 6, 2010. The film is the first in a three-film distribution deal between IM Global (who also produced and fully financed) and Lionsgate, the other two being Pete Travis' Dredd and Simon West's Protection. Lawrence Bender Productions, Trigger Street Productions, Automatik Entertainment, and 87Eleven Action Design also produced.

On a $30 million budget, principal photography took place from October to December 2010 in Philadelphia and New York City. Filming scenes in Philadelphia on Broad Street was done on the nights and early mornings of November 17, 18 and 19. A class from a Catholic School in downtown Philadelphia was used for a scene depicting a class in China.

In the United States, the film was scheduled to be released on October 28, 2011, and March 2, 2012, but was eventually pushed back to April 27, 2012.

Reception
On review aggregator Rotten Tomatoes, the film holds an approval rating of 59% based on 112 reviews, with an average rating of 5.70/10. The website's critics consensus reads: "While hard-hitting and violently inventive, Safe ultimately proves too formulaic to set itself apart from the action thriller pack -- including some of its star's better films." On Metacritic, the film has a weighted average score of 55 out of 100, based on 25 critics, indicating "mixed or average reviews".

Peter Travers, the film critic for Rolling Stone, gave the film 2 stars out of a possible 4, and said that "the trouble with Safe is that you know where it's going every step of the way". He also added that "Between the fists, kicks, bullets, car chases and broken trachea, the movie could have milked the sentiment of that relationship until you puked. But Statham and the scrappy Chan play it hard. The restraint becomes them. Statham is still playing it safe in Safe, but vulnerability is showing through the cracks." Claudia Puig of USA Today gave the film a moderately positive review, saying that "Yakin's slick direction, marked by quick cuts, unstinting energy and a lack of sentimentality, makes the action scenes satisfying," but thought the dialogue was "riddled with clichés." Robert Abele of the Los Angeles Times scored the film 3/5, saying "Yakin gives his star plenty of room to look mean, think fast, drive faster, punch, quip, mow down and charismatically bond with the most imperiled child character in screen memory." Kim Newman gave the film four stars out of five in Empire Magazine, describing it as "A rough, exhausting, exhilarating action picture with a payoff which would have delighted Sam Fuller or Howard Hawks".

See also
 Mental calculators in fiction

References

External links
 
 

2012 films
2012 action thriller films
American action thriller films
Films about the New York City Police Department
Films about police misconduct
Films about corruption in the United States
Films about the Russian Mafia
Films directed by Boaz Yakin
Films produced by Lawrence Bender
Films scored by Mark Mothersbaugh
Films set in New York City
Films shot in New York City
Films shot in Philadelphia
Films with screenplays by Boaz Yakin
IM Global films
Lionsgate films
Triad films
2010s English-language films
2010s American films
2010s Hong Kong films